The official religion of Pakistan is Islam, as enshrined by Article 2 of the Constitution, and is practised by approximately 96.47% of the country's population. The remaining less than 4% practice Hinduism, Christianity, Ahmadiyya, Sikhism and other religions. A 
few aspects of Secularism have also been adopted by Pakistani constitution from British colonial concept. However, religious minorities in Pakistan often face significant discrimination, subject to issues such as violence and the blasphemy laws.

Muslims comprise a number of sects: the majority practice Sunni Islam (estimated at 85–90%), while a minority practice Shia Islam (estimated at 10–15%). Most Pakistani Sunni Muslims belong to the Hanafi school of jurisprudence, which is represented by the Barelvi and Deobandi traditions. However, the Hanbali school is gaining popularity recently due to Wahhabi influence from the Middle East. The majority of Pakistani Shia Muslims belong to the Twelver Islamic law school, with significant minority groups who practice Ismailism, which is composed of Nizari (Aga Khanis), Mustaali, Dawoodi Bohra, Sulaymani, and others.

Before the arrival of Islam beginning in the 8th century, the region comprising Pakistan was home to a diverse plethora of faiths, including Hinduism, Buddhism, Jainism and Zoroastrianism.

Constitutional provisions
The Constitution of Pakistan establishes Islam as the state religion, and provides that all citizens have the right to profess, practice and propagate their religion subject to law, public order, and morality. The Constitution also states that all laws are to conform with the injunctions of Islam as laid down in the Quran and Sunnah.

The Constitution limits the political rights of Pakistan's non-Muslims. Only Muslims are allowed to become the President or the Prime Minister. Only Muslims are allowed to serve as judges in the Federal Shariat Court, which has the power to strike down any law deemed un-Islamic, though its judgments can be overruled by the Supreme Court of Pakistan. However, non-Muslims have served as judges in the High Courts and Supreme Court. In 2019, Naveed Amir, a Christian member of National assembly moved a bill to amend the article 41 and 91 of the Constitution which would allow non-Muslims to become Prime Minister and President of Pakistan. However, Pakistan's parliament blocked the bill.

Secularism

Aspects & Practices of secularism
There was a petition in Supreme Court of Pakistan in the year of 2015 by 17 judges to declare the nation as a "Secular state" officially. Muhammad Ali Jinnah (the founder of Pakistan) wanted Pakistan to be a secular, democratic, and a liberal republic. Pakistan was secular from 1947 to 1955 and after that, Pakistan adopted a constitution in 1956, becoming an Islamic republic with Islam as its state religion.

The main principles of Secularism in the Pakistani constitution were incorporated in its fundamental rights which were granted under various articles of 20, 21, 22 & 25 of the constitution -

(a) Article 20 : Freedom to profess religion and to manage religious institutions.

(b) Article 21 : Safeguard against taxation for purposes of any particular religion.

(c) Article 22 : Safeguards as to educational institutions in respect of religion, etc.

(d) Article 25 : Equality of citizens.

Demographics of religion in Pakistan

1901 to 1931 census 
The 1961 Census of Pakistan (Volume 1 – page 24 of Part II – Statement 2.19) released estimates on the religious composition of the country to the nearest thousandth for Muslims, Hindus, Christians, and others for 60 years prior. The pre-partition figures were derived from prior decadal censuses taken in administrative divisions in British India that would become part of Pakistan following partition, and included separate results for West Pakistan and East Pakistan. As the area that composes the contemporary nation of Pakistan corresponds with the historical administrative unit of West Pakistan, the figures in the table below are for West Pakistan from the 1901 census, 1911 census, 1921 census, and the 1931 census.

1941 census 

The total population of the region that composes contemporary Pakistan was approximately 29,347,813 according to the final census prior to partition in 1941. With the exception of the Federally Administered Tribal Areas, all administrative divisions in the region that composes contemporary Pakistan collected religious data, with a combined total population of 26,970,214, for an overall response rate of 91.9 percent. Similar to the contemporary era, where censuses do not collect religious data in Azad Jammu and Kashmir and Gilgit–Baltistan, the total number of responses for religion is slightly smaller than the total population, as detailed in the table breakdown below.

1951 census 

After partition, when first census of Pakistan was conducted in the year 1951, It was found that the Muslim proportion in West Pakistan (contemporary Pakistan) increased from approximately 77.3 percent according to the 1941 census, to 97.1 percent as per the 1951 census; in contrast, the Hindu proportion in West Pakistan (contemporary Pakistan) decreased from approximately 14.6 percent to 1.6 percent during the same timeframe, as the 1947 Partition of India gave rise to bloody rioting and indiscriminate inter-communal killing of Hindus, Muslims, and Sikhs across the Indian subcontinent. As a result, around 7.2 million Hindus and Sikhs moved to India and 7.5 million Muslims moved to Pakistan permanently, leading to demographic change of both the nations to a certain extent.

2017 census 

As per 2017 Census of Pakistan, the country has a population of 207,684,000.The CCI approved the release of provisional population figures of 207.754 million people. The final results showed the total population of Pakistan to be 207.684 million, a reduction of 68,738 people or 0.033% against provisional results, Pakistan has a population of 224,418,238 as of 2021.

As of 2018, there are 3.63 million non-Muslim voters in Pakistan- 1.77 million were Hindus, 1.64 million Christians, 167,505 were Ahmadi Muslims, 31,543 were Baháʼís, 8,852 were Sikhs, 4,020 were Parsis, 1,884 were Buddhist and others such as Kalashas. The NADRA makes it nearly impossible to declare and change the religion to anything from Islam making the statistics somewhat misleading.

Details 
Pakistan Bureau of Statistics released religious data of Pakistan Census 2017 on 19 May 2021. 96.47% are Muslims, followed by 2.14% Hindus, 1.27% Christians, 0.09% Ahmadis and 0.02% others.

These are some maps of religious minority groups. The 2017 census showed an increasing share in Hinduism, mainly caused by a higher birth rate among the impoverished Hindus of Sindh province. This census also recorded Pakistan's first Hindu-majority district, called Umerkot District, where Muslims were previously the majority.

On the other hand, Christianity in Pakistan, while increasing in raw numbers, has fallen significantly in percentage terms since the last census. This is due to Pakistani Christians having a significantly lower fertility rate than Pakistani Muslims and Pakistani Hindus as well as them being concentrated in the most developed parts of Pakistan, Lahore District (over 5% Christian), Islamabad Capital Territory (over 4% Christian), and Northern Punjab.

The Ahmadiyya movement shrunk in size (both raw numbers and percentage) between 1998 and 2017, while remaining concentrated in Lalian Tehsil, Chiniot District, where approximately 13% of the population is Ahmadiyya.

Here are some maps of Pakistan's religious minority groups as of the 2017 census by district:

Demographics of religion by province/territory

Punjab

Sindh

Khyber Pakhtunkhwa

Balochistan

Azad Jammu and Kashmir

Gilgit–Baltistan

Islam

Islam is the state religion of Pakistan, and about 95-98% of Pakistanis are Muslim. Pakistan has the second largest number of Muslims in the world after Indonesia. The majority are Sunni (estimated at 85-90%), with an estimated 10-15% Shia. A PEW survey in 2012 found that 6% of Pakistani Muslims were Shia. There are a number of Islamic law schools called Madhab (schools of jurisprudence), which are called fiqh or 'Maktab-e-Fikr' in Urdu. Nearly all Pakistani Sunni Muslims belong to the Hanafi Islamic school of thought, while a small number belong to the Hanbali school. The majority of Pakistani Shia Muslims belong to the Twelver (Ithna Asharia) branch, with significant minority who adhere to Ismailism branch that is composed of Nizari (Aga Khanis), Mustaali, Dawoodi Bohra, Sulaymani, and others. Sufis and above mentioned Sunni and Shia sects are considered to be Muslims according to the Constitution of Pakistan.

The mosque is an important religious as well as social institution in Pakistan. Many rituals and ceremonies are celebrated according to Islamic calendar.

Sufi

Islam to some extent syncretized with pre-Islamic influences, resulting in a religion with some traditions distinct from those of the Arab world. Two Sufis whose shrines receive much national attention are Ali Hajweri in Lahore (ca. 11th century) and Shahbaz Qalander in Sehwan, Sindh (ca. 12th century). Sufism, a mystical Islamic tradition, promoted by Fariduddin Ganjshakar in Pakpatan, has a long history and a large popular following in Pakistan. Popular Sufi culture is centered on Thursday night gatherings at shrines and annual festivals which feature Sufi music and dance. Contemporary Islamic fundamentalists criticize its popular character, which in their view, does not accurately reflect the teachings and practice of the Islamic prophet Muhammad and his companions. There have been terrorist attacks directed at Sufi shrines and festivals, 5 in 2010 that killed 64 people.

Ahmadiyya

According to the last Census in Pakistan, Ahmadi made up 0.22% of the population; however, the Ahmadiyya community boycotted the census. Independent groups generally estimate the population to be somewhere between two and five million Ahmadis. In media reports, four million is the most commonly cited figure.

In 1974, the government of Pakistan amended the Constitution of Pakistan to define a Muslim according to Qu'ran 33:40, as a person who believes in finality of Muhammad under the Ordinance XX. According to Ordinance XX, Ahmadis cannot call themselves Muslim or "pose as Muslims" which is punishable by three years in prison. Ahmadis believe in Muhammad as the final law-bearing prophet, but also believe Mirza Ghulam Ahmad to be a prophet, the prophecised Mehdi and second coming of Jesus. Consequently, Ahmadis were declared non-Muslims by a parliamentary tribunal and are subject to persecution under Pakistani blasphemy laws.

Hinduism

Hinduism is the second largest religion affiliation in Pakistan after Islam. As of 2020, Pakistan has the fourth largest Hindu population in the world after India, Nepal and Bangladesh. According to the 1998 Census, the Hindu population was found to be 2,111,271 (including 332,343 scheduled castes Hindus). While according to latest census of 2017, There are 4.4 million Hindus in Pakistan out of 207.68 million total population comprising 2.14% of the country's population of both General and Schedule caste. Hindus are found in all provinces of Pakistan but are mostly concentrated in Sindh. About 93% of Hindus live in Sindh, 5% in Punjab and nearly 2% in Balochistan. They speak a variety of languages such as Sindhi, Seraiki, Aer, Dhatki, Gera, Goaria, Gurgula, Jandavra, Kabutra, Koli, Loarki, Marwari, Sansi, Vaghri and Gujarati.

The Rig Veda, the oldest Hindu text, is believed to have been composed in the Punjab region in the Indian subcontinent around 1500 BCE and spread from there across South and South East Asia slowly developing and evolving into the various forms of the faith we see today.

Many ancient Hindu temples are located throughout Pakistan. A significant Hindu pilgrimage site known as Hinglaj Mata takes place in southern Balochistan, where over 250,000 people visit during spring as a pilgrimage.

Cases collected by Global Human Rights Defence show that underage Hindu (and Christian) girls are often targeted by Muslims for forced conversion to Islam. According to the National Commission of Justice and Peace and the Pakistan Hindu Council (PHC) around 1,000 non-Muslim minority women are converted to Islam and then forcibly married off to their abductors or rapists.

Christianity

Christians make up 1.3% of Pakistan's population. The majority of the Pakistani Christian community consists of Punjabis who converted during the British colonial era and their descendants. Pakistani Christians mainly live in Punjab and in urban centres. There is also a Roman Catholic community in Karachi which was established by Goan and Tamil migrants when Karachi's infrastructure was being developed between the two World Wars. A few Protestant groups conduct missions in Pakistan. The present Christian population in Pakistan is ranged between 2-3 million as per as recent (2020–21) year estimation by various institution and NGOs of Pakistan. There is a small myth that Christianity has been existent in Pakistan ever since a few decades after the crucifixion of Jesus. This myth became more popular after the finding of a structure looking like a giant cross in Northern Pakistan, but there is almost no evidence that this cross is related to Christianity.

There are a number of church-run schools in Pakistan that admit students of all religions, including Forman Christian College, St. Patrick's Institute of Science & Technology and Saint Joseph's College for Women, Karachi.

Pakistan is number eight on Open Doors’ 2022 World Watch List, an annual ranking of the 50 countries where Christians face the most extreme persecution. Cases collected by Global Human Rights Defence show that young underage Christian (and Hindu) girls are sometimes targeted by Muslims for forced conversion to Islam. Christians also often face abuses of Pakistani blasphemy laws, notably in the case of Asia Bibi.

Other religions

Baháʼí

The Baháʼí Faith in Pakistan begins previous to its independence when it was still under British colonial rule. The roots of the religion in the region go back to the first days of the Bábí religion in 1844, with Shaykh Sa'id Hindi who was from Multan. During Bahá'u'lláh's lifetime, as founder of the religion, he encouraged some of his followers to move to the area that is present day Pakistan.

The Baháʼís in Pakistan have the right to hold public meetings, establish academic centers, teach their faith, and elect their administrative councils. Bahá'í sources claim their population to be around 30,000. Shoba Das of Minority Rights Group International reported around 200 Baháʼís in Islamabad and between 2,000 and 3,000 Baháʼís in Pakistan, in 2013. One more PhD thesis says that "It is an assumption that the Bahá’ís do not want to declare their exact population, which is supposed to be more or less 3,000 in total." Most of these Bahá’ís have their roots in Iran.

Sikhism

In the 15th century, the reformist Sikh movement originated in the Punjab region of the Indian subcontinent where Sikhism's founder, as well as most of the faiths disciples, originated from. There are a number of Sikhs living throughout Pakistan today; estimates vary, but the number is thought to be on the order of 20,000. In recent years, their numbers have increased with many Sikhs migrating from neighboring Afghanistan who have joined their co-religionists in Pakistan. The shrine of Guru Nanak Dev is located in Nankana Sahib near the city of Lahore where many Sikhs from all over the world make pilgrimage to this and other shrines.

Zoroastrianism

There are at least 4,000 Pakistani citizen practicing the Zoroastrian religion. The region of Balochistan is believed to be a stronghold of Zoroastrianism before the advent of Islam. With the flight of Zoroastrians from Greater Iran into the Indian subcontinent, the Parsi communities were established. More recently, from the 15th century onwards, Zorastrians came to settle the coast of Sindh and have established thriving communities and commercial enterprises. At the time of independence of Pakistan in 1947, Karachi and Lahore were home to a thriving Parsi business community. Karachi had the most prominent population of Parsis in Pakistan, though their population is declining. Parsis have entered Pakistani public life as social workers, business folk, journalists and diplomats. The most prominent Parsis of Pakistan today include Ardeshir Cowasjee, Byram Dinshawji Avari, Jamsheed Marker, as well as Minocher Bhandara. The founding father of Pakistan, Muhammad Ali Jinnah, married Ratti Bai who belonged to a Parsi family before her conversion to Islam.

Kalash

The Kalash people practise a form of ancient Hinduism mixed with animism. Adherents of the Kalash religion number around 3,000 and inhabit three remote valleys in Chitral; Bumboret, Rumbur and Birir. Their religion has been compared to that of ancient Greece, but they are much closer to the Hindu traditions in other parts of the Indian subcontinent. It is more similar to the historical Vedic religion, than later forms of Hinduism.

Jainism

Several ancient Jain shrines are scattered across the country. Baba Dharam Dass was a holy man whose tomb is located near the bank of a creek called (Deoka or Deokay or Degh) near Chawinda Phatic, behind the agricultural main office in Pasrur, near the city of Sialkot in Punjab, Pakistan. Another prominent Jain monk of the region was Vijayanandsuri of Gujranwala, whose samadhi (memorial shrine) still stands in the city.

Buddhism

Buddhism has an ancient history in Pakistan; currently there is a small community of at least 1500 Pakistani Buddhist in the country. The country is dotted with numerous ancient and disused Buddhist stupas along the entire breadth of the Indus River that courses through the heart of the country. Many Buddhist empires and city states existed, notably in Gandhara but also elsewhere in Taxila, Punjab and Sindh.

The number of Buddhist voters was 1,884 in 2017 and are mostly concentrated in Sindh and Punjab.

Judaism

Various estimates suggest that there were about 1,500 Jews living in Pakistan at the time of its independence on 14 August 1947, with the majority living in Karachi and a few living in Peshawar. However, almost all emigrated to Israel after 1948. There are a few disused synagogues in both cities; while one Karachi synagogue was torn down for the construction of a shopping mall. The one in Peshawar still exists, although the building is not being used for any religious purpose. There is a small Jewish community of Pakistani origin settled in Ramla, Israel.

One Pakistani, Faisal Khalid (a.k.a. Fishel Benkhald) of Karachi claims to be Pakistan's only Jew. He claimed that his mother is Jewish (making him Jewish by Jewish custom) but, his father is a Muslim. Pakistani authorities have issued him a passport which stated Judaism as his religion and have allowed him to travel to Israel.

Irreligion

Irreligion is present among a minority of mainly young people in Pakistan. There are people who do not profess any faith (such as atheists and agnostics) in Pakistan, but their numbers are not known. They are particularly in the affluent areas of the larger cities. Some were born in secular families while others in religious ones. According to the 1998 census, people who did not state their religion accounted for 0.5% of the population, but social pressure against claiming no religion was strong. A 2012 study by Gallup Pakistan found that people not affiliated to any religion account for 1% of the population. Many atheists in Pakistan have been lynched and imprisoned over unsubstantiated allegations of blasphemy. When the state initiated a full-fledged crackdown on atheism since 2017, it has become worse with secular bloggers being kidnapped and the government running advertisements urging people to identify blasphemers among them and the highest judges declaring such people to be terrorists.

See also

 Blasphemy law in Pakistan
 Demographics of Pakistan
 Religious Minorities in Pakistan
 Pakistan National Commission for Minorities
 Shamanism in Pakistan
 Major religious groups
 List of religious populations

References

External links
 – (Government of Pakistan) Official website

 
Religious demographics

pt:Paquistão#Religião